David Baron may refer to:

 David Baron (author), American author of the 2017 book American Eclipse
 David Baron (comics), American comic book colorist
 David Baron (composer), American composer and musician
 David Baron (computer scientist), American computer scientist and Mozilla Distinguished Engineer
 David Baron (fighter) (born 1973), French mixed martial artist
 David Baron (Messianic leader) (1855–1926), Jewish convert to Christianity
 Harold Pinter (1930–2008), English playwright, and actor under the stage name David Baron

See also
 David Barron (disambiguation)
 David Barons (1936–2018), British racehorse trainer